Benzylideneacetone is the organic compound described by the formula C6H5CH=CHC(O)CH3.  Although both cis- and trans-isomers are possible for the α,β-unsaturated ketone, only the trans isomer is observed.  Its original preparation demonstrated the scope of condensation reactions to construct new, complex organic compounds. Benzylideneacetone is used as a flavouring ingredient in food and perfumes.

Preparation
Benzylideneacetone can be efficiently prepared by the base-induced condensation of acetone and benzaldehyde:

However, the benzylideneacetone formed via this reaction can undergo another Claisen-Schmidt condensation with another molecule of benzaldehyde to form dibenzylideneacetone. Because relatively weak bases such as NaOH make very little of the enolate ion at equilibrium, there is still a lot of unreacted base left in the reaction mixture, which can go on and remove protons from the alpha carbon of benzylideneacetone, allowing it to undergo another Claisen-Schmidt condensation and make dibenzylideneacetone.

If, on the other hand, lithium diisopropylamide (LDA) is used as the base, all of the acetone will deprotonated, making enolate ion quantitatively. Therefore, a more efficient, but more expense way to make benzylideneacetone is to combine equimolar amounts of  LDA (in THF), acetone, and benzaldehyde.

Reactions
As with most methyl ketones, benzylideneacetone is moderately acidic at the alpha position, and it can be readily deprotonated to form the corresponding enolate

The compound undergoes the reactions expected for its collection of functional groups: e.g., the double bond adds bromine, the heterodiene adds electron-rich alkenes in Diels-Alder reactions to give dihydropyrans, the methyl group undergoes further condensation with benzaldehyde to give dibenzylideneacetone, and the carbonyl forms hydrazones.  It reacts with Fe2(CO)9 to give (benzylideneacetone)Fe(CO)3, a reagent for transferring the Fe(CO)3 unit to other organic substrates.

Hydrogenation of benzylideneacetone results in a preparation of benzylacetone.
The reaction of 4-Hydroxycoumarin with this compound yields Warfarin.

References

Enones
Phenyl compounds